The 1998 Colonial Athletic Association baseball tournament was held at Grainger Stadium in Kinston, North Carolina, from May 12 through 15.  The event determined the champion of the Colonial Athletic Association for the 1998 season.  Second-seeded  won the tournament for the third time, and second consecutive year, and earned the CAA's automatic bid to the 1998 NCAA Division I baseball tournament.

Entering the event, East Carolina had won the most championships, with five.  Old Dominion had won three, while George Mason and Richmond had each won twice.

Format and seeding
The CAA's teams were seeded one to eight based on winning percentage from the conference's round robin regular season.  They played a double-elimination tournament.

Bracket and results

Most Valuable Player
Mike Dwyer was named Tournament Most Valuable Player.  Dwyer was a first baseman and pitcher for Richmond.

References

Tournament
Colonial Athletic Association Baseball Tournament
Colonial Athletic Association baseball tournament
Colonial Athletic Association baseball tournament
Baseball in North Carolina
College sports in North Carolina
Sports competitions in North Carolina
Tourist attractions in Lenoir County, North Carolina